Acanthodactylus masirae, also called commonly the Masira fringe-fingered lizard or the Masira fringe-toed lizard, is a species of lizard in the family Lacertidae. The species is endemic to Oman.

Etymology
The specific name, masirae, refers to the type locality, Masirah Island.

Geographic range
In Oman, A. masirae is found on Masirah Island and in Dhofar Governorate.

Reproduction
A. masirae is oviparous.

References

Further reading
Arnold EN (1980). "The Reptiles and Amphibians of Dhofar, Southern Arabia". Journal of Oman Studies. Special Report No. 2: 273–332. (Acanthodactylus masirae, new species, pp. 303–307, Plate E + Plate C on p. 295).
Carranza S, Xipell M, Tarroso P, Arnold EN, Robinson MD, et al. (2018). "Diversity, distribution and conservation of the terrestrial reptiles of Oman (Sauropsida, Squamata)". PLoS One 13 (2): e0190389.
van der Kooij, Jeroen (2001). "The herpetofauna of the Sultanate of Oman: Part 3: The true lizards, skinks, and monitor lizards". Podaris 2 (1): 15–26.

Acanthodactylus
Lizards of Asia
Reptiles described in 1980
Taxa named by Edwin Nicholas Arnold
Endemic fauna of Oman